Huddersfield power station supplied electricity to the town of Huddersfield and the wider area from 1893 to 1981. It was owned and operated by Huddersfield Corporation until the nationalisation of the electricity supply industry in 1948. The power station was redeveloped several times: including the incorporation of new plant in the 1910s, and in the 1930s to 1950s. The station was decommissioned in October 1981.

Another power station, together with car sheds and offices, was located at Longroyd Bridge which supplied the Huddersfield tram system with electricity from 1901 to 1940.

History
In 1890 Huddersfield Corporation applied for a Provisional Order under the Electric Lighting Acts to generate and supply electricity to the town. This was granted by the Board of Trade and was confirmed by Parliament through the Electric Lighting Orders Confirmation (No. 3) Act 1890 (53 & 54 Vict. c. clxxxviii). The power station was built in St. Andrew’s Road (53°39'11"N 1°46'27"W) and first supplied electricity on 29 June 1893.

Equipment specification
The original plant at Huddersfield power station comprised vertical condensing engines coupled directly and by ropes to Ferranti and Mordey dynamos. In 1898 the generating capacity was 1,150 kW and the maximum load was 636 kW.

Post-war plant
Following the First World War new plant was installed to meet growing demand for electricity. By 1923 the generating plant comprised:

 Coal-fired boilers generating up to 315,000 lb/h (39.7 kg/s) of steam, these supplied steam to:

 Generators:
 3 × 600 kW reciprocating engines driving generators
 2 × 750 kW steam turbo-alternators
 2 × 2,000 kW steam turbo-alternators
 1 × 4,000 kW steam turbo-alternator
 1 × 6,000 kW steam turbo-alternator

These machines gave a total generating capacity of 17,300 kW of alternating current.

A variety of electricity supplies were available to consumers as:

 single phase, 100 Hz AC at 100 and 200 Volts
 single phase, 50 Hz AC, at 100 and 200 Volts
 3-phase, 50 Hz AC at 400 Volts.

In the early 1920s the Halifax and Huddersfield electricity undertakings interconnected their systems with an underground cable to share supplies. This facility was constructed at considerable cost rather than taking a supply from the Yorkshire Power Company, even though it was offered at a price less than their own costs of generation.

New plant 1938–1955 
New plant was commissioned over the extended period of 1938–1955. 

 Boilers:
 4 × Stirling boilers with chain grate stokers, each 120,000 lb/h (15.1 kg/s), steam conditions 360 and 380 psi and 750°F (24.8/26.2 bar, 400°C),
 4 × Bennis boilers each 180,000 lb/h (22.7 kg/s) with TG stokers, steam conditions 625 psi and 865 °F (43.1 bar, 463°C),

The boilers had a total evaporative capacity of 1,200,000 lb/h (151.2 kg/s), and supplied steam to:

 Turbo-alternators:
 2 × English Electric 20 MW turbo-alternator, generating at 6.8 kV
 2 × GEC 30 MW, turbo-alternators, generating at 11.8 kV.

The completed total installed generating capacity was 100 MW, with an output capacity 64 MW. The generating sets were commissioned over an extended period: November 1938, November 1946, December 1953, and July 1955.

 Condenser cooling water was cooled in three 2.6 million gallons per hour (3.28 m3/s) Davenport concrete cooling towers, make-up water was drawn from the River Colne and canal.

Operations
Operational data for the early years of operation was as follows:

The growth in number of consumers, lamps and current sold is evident.

In 1898 maximum electricity demand was 375 kW.

Operating data 1921–23
The operating data for the period 1921–23 is shown in the table:

The growth of demand and use of electricity is evident.

Under the terms of the Electricity (Supply) Act 1926 (16-17 Geo. 5 c. 51) the Central Electricity Board (CEB) was established in 1926. The CEB identified high efficiency ‘selected’ power stations that would supply electricity most effectively; Huddersfield was designated a selected station. The CEB also constructed the national grid (1927–33) to connect power stations within a region.

Operating data 1946
Huddersfield power station operating data, 1946 is given in the table:

The British electricity supply industry was nationalised in 1948 under the provisions of the Electricity Act 1947 (10-11 Geo. 6 c. 54). The Huddersfield electricity undertaking was abolished, ownership of Huddersfield power station was vested in the British Electricity Authority, and subsequently the Central Electricity Authority and the Central Electricity Generating Board (CEGB). At the same time the electricity distribution and sales responsibilities of the Huddersfield electricity undertaking were transferred to the Yorkshire Electricity Board (YEB).

Operating data 1954–79
Operating data for the period 1954–79 is shown in the table:

The less intensive use of the ‘low pressure’ plant over the period 1954-8 and the increasing use of the high pressure plant 1955–63 is evident, until its usage also declined in the 1970s.

Closure
Huddersfield power station was decommissioned on 26 October 1981. The buildings subsequently demolished and the area has been redeveloped with industrial and commercial units.

See also

 Timeline of the UK electricity supply industry
 List of power stations in England

References

Coal-fired power stations in England
Demolished power stations in the United Kingdom
Former power stations in England
Buildings and structures in Huddersfield